Musiri division is a revenue division in the Tiruchirapalli district of Tamil Nadu, India. It comprises the taluks of Musiri, Thottiyam and Thuraiyur.

References 

 

Tiruchirappalli district